The 2017 Tamil Thalaivas season is the first season of the Tamil Thalaivas' existence in the Pro Kabaddi League. The team is led by Ajay Thakur and coached by K Baskaran. The team is owned by Nimmagadda Prasad and  former Indian cricket captain Sachin Tendulkar, Actors  Allu Arjun and Ram Charan and also  Allu Aravind. Actor Kamal Hasan is the brand ambassador of the team. Tamil Thalaivas play their home matches at the Jawaharlal Nehru Stadium (Chennai), Tamil Nadu.

Review 
The Thalaivas had a good auction as they picked star defender Amit Hooda, who bagged a whopping Rs 63 lakh, along with C Arun and Sanket Chavan to make the defence rock solid. They also signed one of the best do-or-die raiders, Ajay Thakur, who will also be leading the team onto the pitch as captain. M Thivakaran and Sombir are other important names in attack.

Current squad

Points table 
Source: prokabaddi.com
The teams are divided into two zones with each zone having six teams based on their geographical proximity. Each team will play 15 intra-zonal matches and 7 inter-zonal matches.

Zone A

Zone B 

 advanced to Qualifier 1
 advanced to Eliminators
 Five points for every win
 Three points each if draw
 One point if a team loses by seven or fewer points
 Top three teams from each zone qualify for the playoffs
 SD = Score Difference

Sponsors

Tamil Thalaivas announced Muthoot Fincorp India will be the Official Title Sponsor for Season 5, 2017. Powered by Maha Cement, Associate sponsors are Agni Steels, Nippon Paints, Smartron and Admiral Sportswear

References 

Pro Kabaddi League teams
Sport in Chennai
Tamil Thalivas